The 1949 George Washington Colonials football team was an American football team that represented George Washington University as part of the Southern Conference during the 1949 college football season. In their second season under head coach Bo Rowland, the team compiled a 4–5 record (2–3 in the SoCon).

Schedule

References

George Washington
George Washington Colonials football seasons
George Washington Colonials football